Guitar Hero is a music video game for the Sony PlayStation 2 developed by Harmonix and released in 2005. Guitar Heros gameplay features the use of a special guitar-shaped controller modeled after a Gibson SG guitar to recreate the lead guitar part of several rock music songs; the player scores in the game by both pressing one or more fret buttons on the controller and using a strum bar in time with notes as they appear on screen. The game features a total of 47 songs.

Main setlist
There are thirty songs within the solo "Career" mode. The songs are grouped by difficulty into named tiers. Furthermore, four overall difficulty levels — Easy, Medium, Hard, and Expert — are present in the game, reflecting the number of frets that are employed, the number of notes to be played, and the speed at which the notes scroll on the screen.  Tiers are presented sequentially within each difficulty level; in lower difficulty modes, only 3 or 4 songs of each tier must be completed before the next tier is made available for that difficulty level, while in the higher difficulties, all five songs must be completed. Once a tier is opened at any difficulty level, the songs in that tier are playable in quickplay or competitive modes. However, in the easiest difficulty, you only play five tiers, and cannot unlock bonus songs.

All songs are covers of the original versions, credited as, for example, "'Iron Man' as made famous by Black Sabbath", and were performed by WaveGroup Sound for the game.  WaveGroup has released a selection of these covers through paid download services like iTunes in a collection entitled "The Guitar Hero Recordings".

Bonus songs
Seventeen bonus songs are available within Guitar Hero. Bonus songs can be purchased with in-game money earned from the Career mode within the game's virtual store. Once purchased, the songs will be playable at all difficulty levels in Career, quickplay, and competitive modes.  Many of the bands featured in the bonus songs are those that Harmonix members participate in. The song "Cheat on the Church" by Graveyard BBQ was selected for inclusion in the game as the winner of the "Be a Guitar Hero" contest.

All of the bonus songs are the original master tracks.

Other songs
Two other songs are present on the game media, but they can only be unlocked through the use of a PlayStation 2 cheat device, such as GameShark, Code Breaker or Action Replay.
"Graveyard Shift" - by Gurney (An unknown artist, possibly from within Harmonix however most current and former employees claim they knew nothing about the song.)
"Trippolette" - by Andi Buch (credited as Andrew Buch), a composer at Berklee College of Music who has worked on the Harmonix team.

"Trippolette" is also downloadable at the Rock Band Network music store.

References

External links

 Official website

1
Interactive Achievement Award winners